D'Onta Foreman (born April 24, 1996) is an American football running back for the Chicago Bears of the National Football League (NFL). He played college football at Texas, and was drafted by the Houston Texans in the third round of the 2017 NFL Draft.

High school career
Foreman attended Texas City High School in Texas City, Texas. He played running back and defensive end for the Stingarees football team. During his high school football career, he rushed for 4,382 yards (8.2 YPC) with 61 touchdowns, including 2,102 yards and 31 touchdowns as a senior. Foreman committed to the University of Texas at Austin to play college football under then-head coach Charlie Strong.

2010 season 
As a freshman in 2010, Foreman rushed 77 times for 391 yards (5.1 YPC) and two touchdowns. He was given honorable mention for All-District 24-4A as a running back.

2011 season 
As a sophomore in 2011, Foreman rushed for 816 yards and 10 touchdowns on 138 carries (5.9 YPC), while catching 20 passes for 224 yards and two touchdowns and returning eight kickoffs for 262 yards (32.7 YPR) and one touchdown. He was selected first-team All-District 24-4A and Special Teams Player of the Year in 2011.

2012 season 
As a junior in 2012, Foreman rushed 112 times for 1,073 yards (9.6 YPC) and 18 touchdowns while also tallying 40 tackles, 14 tackles for loss, one sack, and nine pressures. He helped Texas City to a 9–3 record and an appearance in the 4A DII area playoffs. Foreman was named first-team All-District 24-4A as a running back and second-team as a linebacker.

2013 season 
As a senior in 2013, Foreman rushed for 2,102 yards and 31 touchdowns on 202 carries (10.4 YPC). He recorded 22 tackles, including 12 tackles for loss and five sacks, five pressures, one interception and returned kickoffs. While helping lead Texas City to a 12–1 record and an appearance in the 4A DII regional playoffs in 2013, Foreman rushed for over 100 yards in all but one game, including three 200-yard contests. He earned first-team All-District 24-4A honors as both a running back and a defensive end. Foreman was named second-team 4A All-State as a running back by the Associated Press in 2013 and also shared 2013 District 24-4A MVP honors with his brother, Armanti. He participated in the 2014 Semper Fidelis All-American Bowl.

Foreman was chosen to the Houston Chronicle'''s Top 100 players in the Houston area. He was ranked the 67th best running back nationally and the 125th best player in the state of Texas by 247Sports. Scout ranked him as the 68th best running back in the nation. ESPN ranked Foreman as the 74th best running back in the country. He was named the sixth best athlete recruit in the state by Dave Campbell's Texas Football Magazine.

 Statistics 

College career
Foreman attended and played college football at the University of Texas from 2014–2016.

Foreman played in seven games as a true freshman at Texas in the 2014 season, rushing 15 times for 73 yards. As a sophomore in 2015, he played in 10 games missing two due to injury. He scored his first collegiate rushing touchdown against Rice on September 12. On November 7, against Kansas, he had a season-high 157 rushing yards and two rushing touchdowns in the victory over the Jayhawks. He rushed for 681 yards on 95 carries with five touchdowns.

Foreman entered his junior year in 2016 as the Longhorns' starting running back. On October 29, 2016, against Baylor, Foreman passed the 1,000 rushing yards for the season mark, becoming the first Texas Longhorn running back since Jamaal Charles in 2007, to do so. During this game, Foreman rushed for 250 yards on 32 carries, scoring 2 touchdowns. During the game against Texas Tech on November 5, 2016, in Lubbock, Texas, Foreman ran for 341 yards on 33 carries, with three touchdowns, helping lead the Longhorns to victory. This game was Foreman's career high for the Longhorns. On November 19, he had 51 carries for 250 rushing yards and two rushing touchdowns in a loss to Kansas. Overall, he finished the 2016 season with 2,028 rushing yards and 15 rushing touchdowns. On November 30, Foreman announced his decision to forgo his last year of eligibility and enter the 2017 NFL Draft. On December 8, he was awarded the Doak Walker Award as the nation's top running back. Foreman was the recipient of the Earl Campbell Tyler Rose Award in recognition of his 2016 season.

College statistics

Professional career

Houston Texans
The Houston Texans selected Foreman in the third round of the 2017 NFL Draft. Foreman was the seventh running back to be drafted in 2017.

On June 16, 2017, the Texans signed Foreman to a four-year, $3.25 million contract that includes a signing bonus of $759,484.

On September 10, 2017, in his NFL debut, Foreman had a four-yard rush in a 29–7 loss to the Jacksonville Jaguars. In the, his role in the offense expanded as he had 12 carries for 40 yards in a 13–9 road victory over the Cincinnati Bengals on Thursday Night Football''. The following week against the New England Patriots, Foreman had eight carries for 25 yards and two receptions for 65 yards in the narrow 36–33 road loss. In Week 11, he had 10 carries for 65 yards and his first two career touchdowns, including a 34-yard score. However, on that touchdown run, Foreman suffered a non-contact injury at the two-yard line and fell into the end zone and immediately grabbed his lower leg. It was revealed that Foreman suffered a torn Achilles and was ruled out for the rest of the season. He was placed on injured reserve on November 22, 2017.

Foreman finished his rookie season with 78 carries for 327 yards and two touchdowns to go along with six receptions for 83 yards in 10 games and one start.

On September 1, 2018, Foreman was placed on the physically unable to perform list to start the season while recovering from his torn Achilles. He was activated off PUP to the active roster on December 4, 2018.

On August 4, 2019, Foreman was waived by the Texans, who cited poor work habits and being late to team meetings.

Indianapolis Colts
On August 5, 2019, Foreman was claimed off waivers by the Indianapolis Colts. He was placed on injured reserve on August 19, 2019, with a torn bicep. He was waived on August 24.

Tennessee Titans
After sitting out the 2019 NFL season, Foreman had a tryout with the Tennessee Titans on August 17, 2020. On September 29, 2020, he was signed to the Titans' practice squad. Foreman was elevated to the active roster on October 31 for the team's Week 8 matchup against the Cincinnati Bengals, and reverted to the practice squad after the game. He was promoted to the active roster on November 7, 2020. During Week 10 against the Indianapolis Colts, he had a receiving touchdown from Ryan Tannehill in the 34–17 loss. The touchdown marked his first with the team and his first overall since Week 16 of the 2018 season. Foreman appeared in six total games as a backup to Derrick Henry and finished the 2020 regular season with 22 rushes for 95 yards to go along with a single five-yard touchdown reception.

Atlanta Falcons 
On August 3, 2021, the Atlanta Falcons held a workout with Foreman. He subsequently signed with the team on August 9, 2021. Foreman was released on August 31, 2021, and re-signed to the practice squad the next day. He was released on September 3, 2021.

Tennessee Titans (second stint)

On November 2, 2021, Foreman was signed to the Tennessee Titans practice squad as a replacement for the injured Derrick Henry, and was promoted to the active roster four days later. During Week 12 against the New England Patriots, Foreman rushed 19 times for 109 yards in the 36–13 road loss. Both Foreman and fellow running back Dontrell Hilliard rushed for over 100 yards in that game, the first time the Titans had two 100-yard rushers in a single game since Chris Johnson and LenDale White in 2008. Two weeks later against the Jacksonville Jaguars, he scored his first rushing touchdown since 2017 while also rushing 13 times for 43 yards in the 20–0 shutout victory. During Week 15 against the Pittsburgh Steelers, Foreman rushed 22 times for 108 yards in the 19–13 road loss. Two weeks later against the Miami Dolphins, he rushed 26 times for 132 yards and a touchdown in the 34–3 victory. Following Henry's injury in Week 8, Foreman was credited for helping the Titans reach the playoffs and win the AFC South in his absence. In the 2021 season, Foreman had 133 carries for 566 rushing yards and three rushing touchdowns to go along with nine receptions for 123 receiving yards in nine games.

Carolina Panthers
On March 16, 2022, Foreman signed a one-year contract with the Carolina Panthers. Because of a mid-season trade involving the Panthers' Christian McCaffrey, Foreman had his largest role in an offense yet, becoming the lead running back in the Panthers' backfield, though he shared time with sophomore back Chuba Hubbard. In Week 7, against the Tampa Bay Buccaneers, Foreman had 15 carries for 118 yards in the 21–3 victory. In Week 8, against the Atlanta Falcons, he had 26 carries for 118 rushing yards and three rushing touchdowns in the 37–34 overtime loss. In Week 16, against the playoff-hopeful Detroit Lions, Foreman would rush for a career-high 165 yards along with a touchdown in the 37-23 upset win. He would finish the season rushing for 914 yards and 5 touchdowns on 203 attempts, all career highs.

Chicago Bears
On March 16, 2023, Foreman signed a one-year contract with the Chicago Bears.

NFL career statistics

Regular season

Postseason

Personal life
Foreman's twin brother, Armanti, also played college football for the Texas Longhorns, as a wide receiver. While attending the University of Texas, Foreman became a member of the Big 12 Commissioner's Honor Roll in the Fall of 2014. On April 24, 2017, Foreman revealed that he had been coping with his infant son's death in 2016. Three months later, Foreman was arrested around 12:24 pm in Austin on charges of possession of marijuana and unlawful carrying of a weapon. According to the University of Texas police department, officers initially responded to a report of marijuana smell coming from three cars parked outside a residence hall. Foreman was taken into custody where he later was released on bond, while six others were cited for possession of marijuana and free to leave the scene.

References

External links

Carolina Panthers bio
Texas Longhorns bio

1996 births
Living people
All-American college football players
American football running backs
Atlanta Falcons players
Houston Texans players
Indianapolis Colts players
People from Texas City, Texas
Players of American football from Texas
Sportspeople from the Houston metropolitan area
Tennessee Titans players
Texas Longhorns football players
Carolina Panthers players
Chicago Bears players